Elmar Seebold (born September 28, 1934) is a German philologist who specializes in Germanic philology. From 1971 to 1983, Seebold was Professor of Germanic philology at the University of Fribourg. He then transferred to the Ludwig Maximilian University of Munich. Seebold retired from the University in 1999. He is the editor of the Etymological Dictionary of the German Language.

Selected works
 Vergleichendes und etymologisches Wörterbuch der germanischen starken Verben, 1970
 Das System der indogermanischen Halbvokale, 1972
 Etymologie. Eine Einführung am Beispiel der deutschen Sprache, 1981
 Das System der Personalpronomina in den frühgermanischen Sprachen. Sein Aufbau und seine Herkunft, 1984
 Chronologisches Wörterbuch des deutschen Wortschatzes. Der Wortschatz des 8. Jahrhunderts (und früherer Quellen), 2001
 Kluge. Etymologisches Wörterbuch der deutschen Sprache, 2011

References

Bibliography
 Kürschners Deutscher Gelehrten-Kalender, 4 Teilbände. De Gruyter, Berlin (23. Ausgabe) 2011. .
 Eduard Studer: Professor Seebold zum Abschied. In: Freiburger Nachrichten vom 13. Juni 1983.

External links
 Elmar Seebold at the website of the Ludwig Maximilian University of Munich

1934 births
German philologists
Germanic studies scholars
Linguists of Germanic languages
Linguists of Indo-European languages
Living people
Scientists from Stuttgart
Academic staff of the University of Fribourg
Academic staff of the Ludwig Maximilian University of Munich